Wai Chee Dimock (born October 29, 1953) writes about public health, climate change, and indigenous communities, focusing especially on the symbiotic relation between humans and nonhumans.  She is a professor at Yale, and a researcher and writer at the Harvard University Center for the Environment.   Her essays have appeared in Artforum, The Hill, Los Angeles Review of Books, Chronicle of Higher Education,  New York Times, New Yorker, and Scientific American.

Dimock was a consultant for "Invitation to World Literature," a 13-part series produced by WGBH, and aired on PBS in the fall of 2010.  A related Facebook forum, "Rethinking World Literature," is ongoing.  Her lecture course, "Hemingway, Faulkner, Fitzgerald," is available through Open Yale Courses.

She graduated from Harvard College in 1976 and Yale University in 1982.

Books
 Weak Planet : Literature and Assisted Survival (U of Chicago P, 2020)
 American Literature in the World: An Anthology from Anne Bradstreet to Octavia Butler (Columbia UP, 2017)
 Shades of the Planet (Princeton UP, 2007)
Through Other Continents: American Literature Across Deep Time (Princeton UP, 2006)
 Residues of Justice: Literature, Law, Philosophy (U of California P, 1997)
 Rethinking Class (Columbia UP, 1994)
 Empire for Liberty: Melville and the Poetics of Individualism (Princeton UP, 1989)

References

External links
Open Yale Courses
 American Literature in the World Facebook
American Literature in the World graduate conference

Yale University faculty
American literary critics
American academics of English literature
Living people
Hong Kong people
Harvard College alumni
Yale University alumni
1953 births